The Wentworth Valley is a valley in the Cobequid Mountains of northwestern Nova Scotia, Canada.  It comprises the lowest elevation pass through the Cobequids. It was named after the colonial governor John Wentworth (1792-1808).

Physical geography
The valley is oriented north–south and is located in a glacial trough named the "Folly Gap" (originally spelled "Folleigh").

The west wall of the valley is formed by Higgins Mountain ( elevation) and the east wall is formed by several unnamed peaks (- elevation).  The south end and highest point of the trough is Folly Lake ( elevation) which drains south to the Bay of Fundy through the Folly River, therefore its waters do not enter the valley.

The Wallace River flows north through the valley to the Northumberland Strait from its source in Dicks Meadows on Higgins Mountain.

The trough descends abruptly north of Folly Lake where over a distance of approximately  the valley floor levels out at approximately  elevation.  From there, the valley floor and the serpentine Wallace River gradually descends over the next  to approximately  elevation at the junction with the West Branch Wallace River.

Transportation
In 1872 the Intercolonial Railway built its mainline between Halifax and Rivière-du-Loup through the valley, rising along its western walls to gain altitude to reach the summit at Folly Lake.  Today, these tracks are part of Canadian National Railway's Springhill Subdivision and continue to form part of the mainline from Halifax to central Canada, hosting both freight and passenger trains.

Roads followed the railway during the 20th century and Trunk 4 was built through the valley and over Folly Mountain to the south. During the early 1960s this road was redesignated Highway 104, forming part of the Trans-Canada Highway. Following this realignment, the former Highway 104 alignment in the valley reverted to its original Trunk 4 designation and is currently classed as a secondary road.

Settlements

The valley contains the following communities from south to north:

 Folly Lake
 Wentworth (including the railway point named Wentworth Station and a hamlet named East Wentworth)
 Wentworth Centre
 West Wentworth
 Lower Wentworth

Economy
The Wentworth Valley is economically dependent on the towns of Truro and Amherst for most goods and services.

The valley is a recreational centre in the winter months due to it being the location of Ski Wentworth, the largest alpine ski hill in Nova Scotia.  The valley is also home to the deactivated Folly Lake Satellite Ground Terminal previously operated by NATO.

In the nineteenth century there were watermills on the Folly and Wallace Rivers and copper was mined from the bedrock. A copper smelter operated for a short time at West Wentworth.

References

Valleys of Nova Scotia
Landforms of Cumberland County, Nova Scotia